The lirone (or lira da gamba) is the bass member of the lira family of instruments that was popular in the late 16th and early 17th centuries.  It is a bowed string instrument with between 9 and 16 gut strings and a fretted neck. When played, it is held between the legs in the manner of a cello or viol (viola da gamba).

It was used in italian operas and oratoriums to accompany the human voice, especially the gods. Because the lira da gambe can not play the bass, there must be a bass instrument, theorbo, harpsichord or viola da gamba.

The sources describe, that the instrument was used for the special sound, although it is an imperfect instrument.

Description
The Grove Dictionary of Music and Musicians describes the lirone as essentially a larger version of the lira da braccio, which has a similar wide fingerboard, flat bridge, and leaf-shaped pegbox with frontal pegs. Its flat bridge allows for the playing of chords of between three and five notes.

History
The lirone was primarily used in Italy  during the late 16th and early 17th centuries (and particularly in the time of Claudio Monteverdi) to provide continuo, or harmony for the accompaniment of vocal music. It was frequently used in Catholic churches, particularly by Jesuits.

Performers
Despite the resurgence in Baroque instrument performance during the 20th century, only a handful of musicians play the lirone.  Notable performers on the instrument include Erin Headley of England, Imke David (Weimar), Claas Harders and Hille Perl of Germany, Annalisa Pappano of the United States, Laura Vaughan of Australia, and Paulina van Laarhoven of the Netherlands.

See also
Lira da braccio
Viol
Violone, a contrabass instrument of the viol family

References

Sources
Erin Headley. "Lirone", Grove Music Online, ed. L. Macy (accessed November 11, 2006), grovemusic.com  (subscription access).
John Weretka. "Homer the lironist: P.F. Mola, Art and Music in the Baroque" 
Imke David "Die sechzehn Saiten der italienischen Lira da gamba", orfeo Verlag, 1999,

External links
Article
Photo of Annalisa Pappano with a 14-string lirone 
Photograph of a lirone 
Henner Harders - Lirone maker

Listening
Lirone audio (track 3 features the instrument accompanied by a plucked string instrument; tracks 1, 2, 5, 6, 7, and 10 feature the lirone in an accompanying role)
Lirone audio

Bowed string instruments
Early musical instruments